There are about seventy to eighty periodicals published in North Korea, twenty of which are major publications. Most of them are official magazines published by specialized state organizations. Typically, there is only one magazine per field, as publishing more is considered a waste of resources.

List

General
 Chollima
 
 Korean Woman

Economics
 Economic Management

Science
 Auto Engineering
  (
 Electronic Engineering
 Hwahakgwa Hwahakgoneop(화학과 화학공업)
 Juche Agriculture
 
 Korean Medicine
 
 Mulri
 
 
 Suhakkwa Mulli

Liberal arts
 
 People's Education
 Philosophy Research

History
 History

Politics
 First-Level Party Official
 Jokook Tongil
 Kulloja
 Party Life

Culture
 Choson Yesul 
 
 Korean Architecture
 
 Sports

Literature
 Adong Munhak

Foreign-language
 
 Foreign Trade of the DPRK
 Journal of Kim Il Sung University (Natural Science)
 Journal of Kim Il Sung University (Social Science)
 Korea
 Korea Today
 Korean Women
 Korean Youth and Students

Published abroad
 , published in Japan

See also

 Media of North Korea
 List of newspapers in North Korea

References

North
Lists of mass media in North Korea

Mass media in North Korea